The Walkers are Welcome scheme is a community-led initiative operating in England, Scotland and Wales. The scheme promotes towns and communities as 'walker-friendly', based on a number of criteria, aiming to benefit local economies by attracting tourism.

Overview
The scheme was first proposed in Summer 2006 by a local walkers group in the Yorkshire town of Hebden Bridge and formally launched on 18 February 2007. Since then, it has expanded rapidly and more than ninety towns and villages have been granted Walkers are Welcome status.

The Walkers are Welcome Towns Network claims that the scheme helps strengthen a town’s reputation as a destination for visitors, and also brings benefits to the local economy, encouraging the towns to view walkers as "economic assets".

The Walkers are Welcome logo is widely used in towns with the status.  Welsh, Scottish Gaelic and Cornish versions of the logo are in use in Wales, Scotland and Cornwall.

Organisation
The scheme is run by the towns and villages themselves, who are all members of the Walkers are Welcome Towns Network.  The Network operates through a committee that meets every six to eight weeks as well as an annual conference.

The scheme is different from most official accreditation schemes in being managed through peer review, rather than through a top-down agency.  Direct community engagement is considered essential to the scheme’s success.

The current patron is the Ramblers Association vice-president Kate Ashbrook.

Objectives and criteria for inclusion
The main aim of the campaign is to get towns to be more supportive of hikers. Towns and villages wishing to receive Walkers are Welcome status are required to meet six criteria.  These are:
 Demonstration of popular local support for the concept.
 Formal endorsement by local council.
 Action to maintain facilities for walkers in good condition.
 Adequate marketing of the Walkers are Welcome status.
 Encouragement of use of public transport.
 Procedures in place to demonstrate sustainability of local interest.

References

External links 
 

Hiking organizations
Charities based in the United Kingdom
Walking in the United Kingdom